Niklas Kreuzer (born 20 February 1993) is a German professional footballer who plays as a right-back for  side Hallescher FC.

Career 
In 2013, Kreuzer joined FC Rot-Weiß Erfurt on a free transfer from the FC Basel second team. He made 18 appearances for Rot-Weiß Erfurt in the 2013–14 3. Liga.

Ahead of the 2014–15 season, Kreuzer signed a one-year contract with Dynamo Dresden. Following the season, Kreuzer signed an extension with Dynamo Dresden for two more years until 2017.

In 2021, Kreuzer rejoined Dynamo Dresden on a short-term contract until the end of the season.

Personal life
He is the son of Oliver Kreuzer.

Career statistics

References

External links

1993 births
Living people
German footballers
Germany youth international footballers
Footballers from Munich
Association football fullbacks
FC Basel players
FC Rot-Weiß Erfurt players
Dynamo Dresden players
Hallescher FC players
2. Bundesliga players
3. Liga players